The  Maratha Conquests were a series of conquests in the Indian subcontinent which led to the building of the Maratha Empire. These conquests were started by Shivaji in 1659, from the victory at the Battle of Pratapgad against Bijapur. The expansion of the empire was limited and interrupted by the Mughal conquests of south India by Mughal emperor Aurangzeb. Marathas were forced to defend their territories against the overwhelmingly strong Mughal army in the 27 years long Deccan wars. They were able to defend their territories and gain an upper hand over Mughals in the sustained conflict.

Afterwards, the Marathas conclusively defeated and overtook major territories of the Mughal Empire in the Indian subcontinent and its vassals. It ended with the eventual fall of the Maratha Empire after the Anglo-Maratha Wars.

Background
Shivaji's father Shahji had earlier served as a Jagirdar under Adil Shah. Shivaji inherited this land and later revolted against the Adil Shahi dynasty, carving out a kingdom with Raigad as his capital. After Treaty of Purandar signed on 11 June 1665, Shivaji was incorporated as a vassal and had to send his son Sambhaji to fight for the Mughals in the Deccan as a mansabdar along with 5,000 horsemen, Shivaji seeing that he wasn't getting much prestige in Mughal Darbar, revolted and fought against the Mughals and raided the rich city of Surat. He crowned himself in 1674 as a Chhatrapati, establishing the Maratha Kingdom Shivaji died in 1680. After Shivaji, Sambhaji took up throne. He built strong army as well as navy. Mughal emperor Aurangzeb shifted his capital from Delhi to Aurangabad. Sambhaji defeated Mughals, Chikkadevaraja of Mysore and portugals in many battles but captured at Sangameshwar in 1689 when Ganoji Shirke (brother in law of Sambhaji) informed his secret location to Mughals. After that Sambhaji was brutally tortured and later killed. The Mughals invaded, fighting a War of 27 years from 1681 to 1707 in which the Marathas under Tarabai were victorious. Shahu I, a grandson of Shivaji, ruled as emperor until 1749. During his reign, Shahu appointed the first Peshwa as head of the government, under certain conditions. After the death of Shahu, the Peshwas became the de facto leaders of the Empire from 1749 to 1761, while Shahu's successors continued as nominal rulers from their base in Satara. Covering a major part of the subcontinent, the Maratha Empire kept the British forces at bay during the 18th century, until internal relations between the Peshwas and their sardars (army commanders) deteriorated, provoking its gradual downfall.

The Maratha Empire was at its height in the 18 th century under Peshwa Balaji Baji Rao. Losses at the Third Battle of Panipat in 1761 suspended further expansion of the empire in the Afghanistan and reduced the power of the Peshwas. In 1761, after severe losses in the Panipat war, the Peshwas slowly started losing the control of the kingdom. Many military chiefs of the Maratha Empire like Shinde, Holkar, Gaikwad, PantPratinidhi, Bhosale of Nagpur, Dev (Gade) of Wardha, Pandit of Bhor, Patwardhan, and Newalkar started to work towards their ambition of becoming kings in their respective regions. However, under Madhavrao Peshwa, Maratha authority in North India was restored, 10 years after the battle of Panipat. After the death of Madhavrao, the empire gave way to a loose Confederacy, with political power resting in a 'pentarchy' of five mostly Maratha dynasties: the Peshwas of Pune; the Sindhias (originally "Shindes") of Malwa and Gwalior; the Holkars of Indore; the Bhonsles of Nagpur; and the Gaekwads of Baroda. A rivalry between the Sindhia and Holkar dominated the confederation's affairs into the early 19th century, as did the clashes with the British and the British East India Company in the three Anglo-Maratha Wars. In the Third Anglo-Maratha War, the last Peshwa, Baji Rao II, was defeated by the British in 1818 and the empire ceased to exist.

Battles under Shivaji

Battle of Pratapgad 

The Battle of Pratapgad was a battle fought on 10 November 1659 at the fort of Pratapgad near the town of Satara, Maharashtra, India between the forces of the Marathas under the Maratha leader Shivaji and the Adilshahi troops under the Adilshahi general Afzal Khan. The Marathas defeated the Adilshahi forces. It was their first significant military victory against a major regional power, and led to the eventual establishment of the Maratha Empire.

Battle of Kolhapur 

Battle of Kolhapur was a land battle that took place on 28 December 1659 near the city of Kolhapur, Maharashtra between the Maratha king Shivaji and the Adilshahi forces. The battle is known for brilliant movement of flanks by Shivaji.

Battle of Pavankhind 

The Battle of Pävankhind was a rearguard last stand that took place on 13 July 1660 at a mountain pass in the vicinity of fort Vishalgad, near the city of Kolhapur, Maharashtra, India between the Maratha Baji Prabhu Deshpande, and warriors Bandal and Siddi Masud of Adilshah Sultanate. The engagement ended with the destruction of 5000 bijapur forces resulted in a major set back in capturing shivaji.

Battle of Chakan 

The Mughal army advancing towards Pune had to overcome the fort of Chakan around 30 km from the city.
The fort of Chakan was a Bhuikot, i.e. a land fort and was occupied by around 800 infantry .Mughal forces laid siege to the fort hoping for a quick surrender by the numerically inferior Maratha garrison.

However the Mughal artillery was unable to force the fort into submission. Several assaults by the Mughals were repulsed with high casualties. After almost two and half months without success the Mughals finally resorted to mining the Buruj or tower of the fort. With the towers demolished the Maratha force agreed to come to terms. The remainder of the garrison withdrew from the fort

Battle of Umberkhind 

The Battle of Umberkhind took place on 3 February 1661 in the mountain range of Sahyadri near the city of Pen, Maharashtra, India. The battle was fought between the Maratha under Shivaji and Kartalab Khan of the Mughal Empire. The Marathas decisively defeated the Mughal forces. This battle was a great example of guerrilla warfare.

Battle of Surat 

The Battle of Surat took place on 5 January 1664, near the port city of Surat between Maratha ruler Shivaji and Inayat Khan, a Mughal captain. The Marathas defeated the Mughal force, and sacked the city of Surat for six days. The loot was then transferred to Rajgad fort. It was also a battle were many died.

Battle of Purandar 

The Battle of Purandar was fought between the Mughal Empire and Maratha Army in 1665. The Mughal Emperor, Aurangzeb, sent his general Jai Singh to besiege Shivaji's fortress at Purandar. After Mughal forces killed Maratha General Murarbaji on 2 June 1665, Shivaji took treaty with Mughals and gave up 23 of his fortresses.

Battle of Sinhagad 

The Battle of Sinhagad took place during the night on 4 February 1670 on the fort of Sinhagad (then known as Kondhana) between subedar Tanaji Malusare, commander of the Marathas. and Udaybhan Singh Rathore, the fort keeper under Jai Singh I who worked for the Mughal emperor Aurangzeb. Climbing up the fort, the Marathas were intercepted by the Mughal garrison and combat ensued between the guards and the few infiltrators that had managed to climb up by this time. Both Tanhaji and Udaybhan were killed in the battle but the overwhelming Maratha forces managed to capture the fort after the reinforcements penetrated the gateway of the fort from another route.

Battle of Salher 

The Battle of Salher which was a battle fought between the Marathas and the Mughal Empire in February 1672 CE. The battle was fought near the fort of Salher in the Nashik district. The result was a decisive victory for the Marathas. This battle is considered particularly significant as it is the first battle in which the Mughal Empire lost on an open field. Mughal empire started to decline after this battle and the battle of Dindori fought one year earlier.

Maratha occupation of Kolistan

Maratha occupation of Kolistan (lit. Land of the Koli people) in the year 1672 was a campaign in which the Maratha army under Shivaji's son Prince Sambhaji defeated the allied forces of Koli kings of Jawhar and Ramnagar and the Mughal Empire. The Marathas captured the region called Kolistan encompassing the Jawhar, Mokhada, Wada, Talasari, Vikramgad talukas in present-day Palghar district of Maharashtra and the regions Southern Gujarat controlled by the Koli king of Ramnagar.

Battle of Vikramgad

The Battle Of Vikramgad Was a land battle that took place in the year 1672 near Vikramgad, Palghar district, Maharashtra between the Maratha Empire and the Mughal Empire. The Marathas were led by prince Sambhaji and the Mughals were led by Khijr Khan. The Marathas won a decisive victory and it consolidated their territorial gains in Kolwan.

Battle of Bhupalgarh

The Battle of Bhupalgarh occurred between the Mughal and Maratha Empire in 1679. The battle resulted in the defeat of the Marathas and capture, loot and razing of the fort of Bhupalgarh under Firangoji Narsala by the Mughal forces led by Diler Khan.

Battle of Sangamner

The Battle of Sangamner was fought between the Mughal Empire and Maratha Empire in 1679. This was the last battle in which the Maratha king Shivaji fought. The Mughals had ambushed Shivaji when he was returning from a sack on Jalna. The Marathas engaged in battle with the Mughals for three days until Maratha General, Sidhoji Nimbalkar was killed alongside 2,000 Maratha soldiers. The Maratha force was largely decimated defending their king, however Shivaji managed to retreat with 500 men.

Battle of Dindori 
A fierce obstinate battle was fought for hours between the two sides between Vani and Dindori. Daud Khan, Ikhilas Khan, Sangram Khan and other important Mughal nobles fought with great courage using their artillery, though with limited advantage. On the Maratha side, Shivaji himself was conducting the operations in this one of the few open battles fought man to man. The battle ended with about 3000 Mughal troops dead and a number of Mughal officers captured. The Marathas also captured about 4000 horses. The Mughal governor of Dindori, Sangram Khan, was allowed to join Shivaji's service. In this way Shivaji won a great victory in this battle which neutralized Mughal power in this region for quite some time.

Battles after the death of Shivaji

War of 27 Years 

War of 27 years was a series of battles fought between Marathas and Mughals from 1680 to 1707 in the Indian subcontinent. It was a series of battles. The war started in 1680 with the Mughal emperor Aurangzeb's invasion of the Maratha enclave in Bijapur established by Shivaji.

The war can be broken down into three distinct phases :
Marathas under Sambhaji (1681–1689).
Marathas under Rajaram (1689–1700).
Marathas under Maharani Tarabai (1700–1707).

It was a long snakes and ladders war game involving a quarter of a century and innumerable long and short battles. The war ended after the death of Aurangzeb in 1707, because of unstable later Mughals. It also paved the way for the Maratha expansion in the North.

Battles under Sambhaji 
Shivaji was succeeded by his son Sambhaji, after his death in April 1680. His son Sambhaji also called as Chhatrapati Sambhaji Maharaj was also a genius military commander like Shivaji.He fought his first battle(battle of vikramgad) at the age of 15 years in which he defeated Outnumbered Mughals. After that Sambhaji fought many victorious battles in his short life. Sambhaji managed to defend the Maratha Empire against the overwhelmingly strong Mughal Empire. Sambhaji fought many battles in his reign against his enemies such as Mughal Empire, Siddis of Janjira, Portuguese of Goa and North Konkan(Mumbai & Ghodbunder fort), Chikkadevaraya of Mysore.

Sacking of Burhanpur

The Sacking of Burhanpur (31 January 1681 – 2 February 1681) refers to the looting of the wealthy Mughal city Burhanpur in Madhya Pradesh by the Maratha ruler Sambhaji. The Maratha army commanded by Sambhaji and Hambirrao Mohite attacked and plundered the city for three days. The Marathas got a huge loot and returned to Raigad by evading Mughal forces.

Siege of Janjira (1682)

Siege of Janjira (1682) was a military conflict and a part of the Mughal-Maratha war. It was fought between the Maratha Empire led by Sambhaji and Siddis of Janjira, allies of the Mughal Empire. Sambhaji personally besieged the fort of Murud-Janjira in 1682 to stop Siddi's intrusions into Maratha Territories and to capture the strategically important fort of Janjira.

Battle of Kalyan

The Battle of Kalyan occurred between the Mughal Empire and Maratha Empire between 1682 and 1683. General Bahadur Khan of the Mughal Empire defeated the Maratha army and took over Kalyan fort. The Marathas attempted a counter offensive, but failed and they were repulsed and their army was destroyed by Mughal forces.

Siege of Ramsej

Siege of Ramsej (1682-1688) was a sustained  military conflict between Maratha Empire and Mughal Empire for the control of Ramsej fort in Nashik district of Maharashtra. The 600 Marathas under Killedar Suryaji Jedhe were able defend the fort against the overwhelmingly strong Mughal army for six years. After 5 years Suryaji Jedhe was transferred to another fort according to the rotation policy of the Maratha Administration. Mughals bribed the new Killedar and captured the fort in 1688.

Maratha-Mysore War 

The king of Mysore Chikka Devaraja had allied with the Mughal Empire. Marathas and Mysore were already fighting for supremacy in southern India. The earlier conflicts were inconclusive with wins and losses for both sides. Sambhaji with his allies Abul Hasan Qutb Shah and Basappa Nayaka invaded Mysore in June 1682. Chikka Devaraja defeated the allies at the Battle of Banavar but Sambhaji bounced back to score a major victory at the Battle of Trichinopoly (1682). After this victory, Sambhaji's forces captured many forts in the northern Madurai region. Some allies of Mysore also joined the Marathas in this campaign. Chikka Devaraha had to pay a tribute of 1 Crore Honas to the Marathas. Sambhaji returned to Maharashtra after the Dusshera of 1682.

Maratha invasion of Goa

Maratha Invasion of Goa (1683) or Sambhaji's Invasion of Goa refers to the Maratha invasion of Portuguese controlled Goa and the Konkan region. The battles were fought between the Maratha Empire and Portuguese India. The conflicts between the two powers were ongoing in the region of Northern Konkan in 1682-1683. The Portuguese viceroy Francisco de Távora attacked the Maratha controlled Ponda Fort in late 1683. The Maratha King Sambhaji arrived with reinforcements and tried to press on the advantage of the victory at Ponda. He stormed the colony of Goa, Marathas captured many forts in the colony of Goa. The Maratha army was preemptively mobilized for this event. The Portuguese situation became dire. Sambhaji stayed in the region for over a month, his forces also pillaged Salcete and Bardez region. Sambhaji came very close to capturing the City of Old Goa, but his forces retreated from Goa and the Konkan on 2 January 1684 to avoid the large Mughal army under prince Muazzam (later Bahadur Shah I)

Mughal invasion of Konkan

Mughal invasion of Konkan (1684) was a part of the Deccan wars. It was a campaign launched by Mughal Emperor Aurangzeb to capture the Konkan region from the Maratha Empire under Sambhaji. The Mughal forces were led by Mu'azzam and Shahbuddin Khan. The harsh climate and the Maratha guerrilla strategy forced the numerically strong Mughal army into a slow retreat. The Mughal army suffered great losses in this unsuccessful campaign.

Battle of Wai

Battle of Wai was fought in the fall of 1687 as a part of the Mughal–Maratha Wars. Sambhaji sent his forces under his senapati, Hambirao Mohite, to oppose Mughal army led by Sarja Khan. The Mughal's were drawn into the dense jungles near Wai and Mahableshwar where the Mughals were defeated. However, among the dead was Hambirao, a serious blow to Sambhaji's cause.

Battles under Baji Rao I

Battle of Palkhed

Battle of Palkhed was a land battle that took place on 28 February 1728 at the village of Palkhed, near the city of Nashik, Maharashtra, India between the Maratha Peshwa, Baji Rao I and the Nizam-ul-Mulk of Hyderabad. The Marathas defeated the Nizam. The battle is considered an example of brilliant execution of military strategy.

Battle of Jaitpur

In Bundelkhand, Chhatrasal had rebelled against the Mughal Empire and established an independent kingdom. In December 1728, a Mughal force led by the distinguished commander Muhammad Khan Bangash attacked him, and besieged his fort with his family. Chhatrasal had repeatedly sought Peshwa Baji Rao's assistance, but the latter was busy in Malwa at that time.

In March 1729, the Peshwa Baji Rao I finally responded to Chhatrasal's request and marched towards Bundelkhand. Chhatrasal also escaped his captivity and joined the Maratha forces. After they marched to Jaitpur, as a result Bangash was forced to retreat from Bundelkhand. Chhatrasal's position as the ruler of Bundelkhand was restored.

Battle of Dabhoi

In the year 1731, Asaf Jah I the Nizam of Hyderabad had managed to secure the defections of influential Maratha leaders such as Trimbak Rao Dabhade and Sanbhoji who threatened to abandon the Marathas and join the forces with the Mughal Emperor Muhammad Shah instead. This move was considered unacceptable by Baji Rao I and his brother Chimnaji Appa who led a large well armed brigade of Marathas to intercepted Trimbak Rao Dabhade and Sanbhoji during the Battle of Dabhoi, where the defecting factions were all defeated, overrun and eliminated.

Battle of Mandsaur
The Battle of Mandsaur took place in Mandsaur, modern day Madhya Pradesh between Marathas, commanded by Malharrao Holkar, and Jai Singh of Amber, in which Jai Singh was defeated in February, 1733. Malhar Rao Holkar then conquered Bundelkhand and Bundi.

Battle of Delhi

In November 1736, the Maratha Peshwa Baji Rao I advanced on Old Delhi to attack the Mughal capital. Mughal emperor Muhammad Shah sent Saadat Ali Khan I with a 150,000-strong army to stop the Maratha advance on Delhi. But Baji Rao's subordinate chiefs Malhar Rao Holkar and Pilaji Jadhav crossed the river Yamuna and looted Ganga-Yamuna Doab. Saadat Khan then retired to Mathura, thinking the Marathas had retreated towards Pune. But Baji Rao's army advanced to Delhi and encamped near Talkatora.
Muhammad Shah sent Mir Hasan Khan Koka with an army to intercept Baji Rao. The Mughals were devastated by the fierce Maratha attack, and lost half of their army, which compelled them to ask for all regional rulers to help against the army of the Marathas. After the battle, when the news of Saadat Ali Khan's approaching large Mughal army reached Baji Rao, he retreated to Pune.

Battle of Bhopal

The Battle was fought between the Maratha Empire and Mughal forces led by Nizam of Hyderabad near Bhopal in India in December 1737. The Marathas poisoned the water and the replenishment supplies of the besieged Mughal forces. Chimaji was sent with an army of 10,000 men to stop any reinforcements while Bajirao blockaded the city instead of directly attacking the Nizam. The Nizam was forced to sue for peace after he was denied reinforcements from Delhi.    The battle resulted in decisive Maratha victory mainly through the swift tactics of Maratha Peshwa Baji Rao.

Battle of Vasai

The Battle of Vasai was fought between the Marathas and the Portuguese rulers of Vasai, a village lying near Bombay in the present-day state of Maharashtra, India. The Marathas were led by Chimaji Appa,  brother of Peshwa Baji Rao I. Maratha victory in this war was a major achievement of Baji Rao I reign.

Maratha invasions of Bengal

First Battle of Katwa

The Battle of Katwa occurred between the Nawab of Bengal and Maratha Empire in 1742. The Maratha's initially attacked and captured Katwa and Hooghly, in Bengal. The Nawab of Bengal Ali Vardi Khan responded with a direct attack at the Maratha camp at Katwa in the nightfall, so much that the entire Maratha army evacuated out of Bengal on September 17, 1742 believing a much larger force had charged them.

Second Battle of Katwa

The Second Battle of Katwa occurred between the Nawab of Bengal and Maratha Empire in 1745. After the initial evacuation of the Maratha's at the First Battle of Katwa, the Maratha General, Raghuji Bhonsle attempted, once again, to conquer Katwa. Bhonsle, with 20,000 horsemen attacked Murshidabad then moved onwards to Katwa, where Nawab of Bengal Ali Vardi Khan fought Raghuji and his men, with Marathas moving in towards Medinipur in Bengal.

Battle of Burdwan

The Battle of Burdwan occurred between the Nawab of Bengal and Maratha empires in 1747. After the dismissal of Mir Jafar by Ali Vardi Khan, an army was amassed to defend against the invading Maratha forces of Janoji Bhonsle at Orissa. Ali Vardi Khan managed to heavily repulse and defeat the Maratha's in this battle.

Maratha conquest of Northwest India

Battle of Delhi, 1757

The Battle of Delhi was fought on 11 August 1757 between Maratha Empire under the command of Raghunathrao and Rohilla Afghans under Najib-ud-Daula. The battle was waged by the Marathas for the control of Delhi, the Mughal capital which was now under the control of Rohilla chief Najib-ud-Daula, as a consequence of fourth invasion of Ahmad Shah Abdali.

Malharrao Holkar, Raghunathrao, Shamsher Bahadur, Gangadhar Tatya, Sakharambapu, Naroshankar and Maujiram Bania attacked Delhi and defeated Najib Khan and Ahmed Khan became the Mir Bakshi in his place. In March, 1758, they conquered Sirhind. On 20 April 1758, Malharrao Holkar and Raghunathrao attacked and conquered Lahore. Subsequently Marathas conquered Attock on 28 April and Peshawar 8 May. In Lahore, as in Delhi, the Marathas were now major players. The Maratha Empire had reached its peak, the empire's territories covered most of South Asia.

Third Battle of Panipat

The Third Battle of Panipat took place on 14 January 1761 at Panipat (Haryana State, India), about 60 miles (95.5 km) north of Delhi. The battle pitted the pitted the artillery and cavalry of the Marathas against the heavy cavalry and mounted artillery (zamburak and jezail) of the Afghans led by Ahmad Shah Durrani, an ethnic Pashtun, also known as Ahmad Shah Abdali. The famished, burdened and outnumbered Marathas were defeated with heavy casualties. There were near 100,000 soldiers dead adding both sides and the battle resulted in retreat of Marathas from Delhi for next ten years.

Maratha Resurrection

Restoration of Maratha suzerainty in the North
Under Madhavrao Peshwa, Maratha authority in North India (including Delhi) was restored ten years after the battle of Panipat. The Rohillas were defeated and were forced to pay a heavy war indemnity. Delhi was captured by Mahadji Scindia in late 1770 and restored Mughal emperor Shah Alam II to the throne of Delhi in 1772.

Battle of Alegaon

The Battle of Alegaon was fought between Nizam Ali Khan of Hyderabad and Raghunathrao of the Maratha Empire against Peshwa Madhavrao of the Maratha Empire. Raghunathrao had established an alliance with Nizam Ali Khan of Hyderabad. When conflict arose between Raghunathrao and Madhavrao I, a joint campaign between Nizam Ali Khan and Raghunathrao resulted in Madhavrao I being heavily defeated. Peshwa Madhavrao surrendered on November 12, 1762. Nizam Ali Khan got all of his previously lost territories that were lost at the Battle of Udgir. Peshwa Madhavrao submitted to his uncle, Raghunathrao.

Battle of Rakshasbhuvan

The Battle of Rakshasbhuvan was fought on 10 August 1763. While the Marathas were fighting amongst themselves during a civil war, the Nizam decided to attack. The Nizam however failed. The Nizam gave up territory he gained during the Battle of Alegaon in an attempt to sue for peace.

Capture of Delhi, 1771

The forces of Mahadji Shinde captured Delhi in 1771 and the Mughal Emperor Shah Alam II was restored to the throne. Marathas capture Delhi by defeating Afghans under Najib khan. With this battle they regained their lost supremacy in North India after the Third Battle of Panipat and conquered much of the lost territories which they lost after the Third Battle of Panipat.

Marathas in Rohilkhand
After taking control of Delhi, Marathas sent a large army in 1772 to "punish" Afghan Rohillas for Panipat. Maratha army devastated Rohilkhand by looting and plundering and also took the members of royal family as captives. Maratha general Mahadaji was "very much pleased with the revenge taken by his men" for Panipat

Conflict with the Kingdom of Mysore

Battle of Rutehalli Fort
In 1764, following the attack by Hyder Ali on Nawabs of Savanur, who were a tributary to the Marathas, Maratha army led by Peshwa Madhav Rao met the forces of Hyder Ali at Rutehalli Fort. Hydar Ali tried to avoid pitched battles against Maratha Forces however Maratha forces intercepted Mysore forces near Rutehalli Fort in Karnatic and a crushing defeat was imposed upon them, Hydar Ali lost well over 1,000 men and himself fled into the local forest to save his life.

Battle of Sira and Madgiri

In 1767,  Maratha army led by Peshwa Madhav Rao defeated the forces of Hyder Ali at Sira and Madgiri. Marathas conquered the forts of Haskote and Nandigarh and laid siege to Bednur where Hyder Ali was taking shelter.

Siege of Saunshi

Hyder Ali of Mysore attempted to try to regain his lost territories of Malabar and Coorg from the Marathas. Hyder Ali who was the prime minister to maharaja of Mysore decided to attack the Marathas at Saunshi. Hyder Ali decided to send his General, Muhammad Ali to attack the Maratha position. The result of the battle was a victory for Mysore against the Maratha forces. Maratha Chief Konher Rao was killed and Pandurang Rao was caught by the Mysore forces.

Siege of Nargund

The Siege of Nargund occurred when the Kingdom of Mysore sent its General, Burhanuddin to besiege Nargund. In 1778, and ended with a victory of Mysore

Siege of Adoni

The Siege of Adoni occurred between the forces of Tipu Sultan of the Kingdom of Mysore and the Maratha Empire allied with the Nizam of Hyderabad. Tipu Sultan surprised Haripant when he decided to advance for Adoni. In 1786, Adoni was besieged for one month and then captured by Tipu Sultan.

Battle of Savanur

The Battle of Savanur concluded in October, 1786, with the victory of Tipu Sultan over the Marathas. Tipu strategically lured the Marathas out of their position on a height near Savanur and unleashed a barrage of heavy fire on them. This devastated the Maratha army, making them retreat and Tipu Sultan conquered Savanur soon after.

Siege of Bahadur Benda

The Siege of Bahadur Benda happened between the forces of Tipu Sultan of Mysore and the Maratha forces of Haripant. Tipu Sultan defeated the Maratha forces. Following this battle, a peace agreement was signed between the [kingdom of Mysore] and the Maratha Empire, which allowed for Tipu Sultan to focus his resources into combating the British Empire.

Battle of Gajendragad

The Battle of Gajendragad was fought in June 1786, during the Maratha-Mysore War. An army of the Maratha Empire led by Tukoji Rao Holkar, defeated the army of Tipu Sultan and captured the town and fortress at Gajendragad. Mysore was obligated to pay 4.8 million rupees as a war cost to the Marathas, and an annual tribute of 1.2 million rupees. The treaty of Gajendragad signed after the battle ended the Maratha-Mysore conflict.

First Anglo Maratha War (1775 - 1783)

Battle of Wadgaon 

The East India Company's force from Bombay consisted of about 3,900 men (about 600 Europeans, the rest Asian) accompanied by many thousands of servants and specialist workers. They were joined on the way by Raghunath's forces, adding several thousand more soldiers, and more artillery. The Maratha army included forces contributed by all the partners in the federation, tens of thousands in all, commanded by Tukojirao Holkar and General Mahadji Shinde (also known as Mahadji Sindia).
Mahadji slowed down the British march and sent forces west to cut off its supply lines. When they found out about this, the British halted at Talegaon, a few hours' brisk march from Pune, but days away for the thousands of support staff with their ox-drawn carts. Now the Maratha cavalry harassed the enemy from all sides. The Marathas also utilized a scorched earth policy, burning farmland and poisoning wells.
The British began to withdraw from Talegaon in the middle of the night, but the Marathas attacked, forcing them to halt in the village of Wadgaon (now called Vadgaon or Vadgaon Maval), where the British force was surrounded on 12 January 1779. By the end of the next day, the British were ready to discuss surrender terms, and on 16 January signed the Treaty of Wadgaon that forced the Bombay government to relinquish all territories acquired by the Bombay office of the East India Company since 1773.

Battle of Patan

The Battle of Patan was fought on June 20, 1790 between the Maratha Empire and the Rajputs of Jaipur and their Mughal allies. Many Rajput kingdoms like those of Jaipur and Malwa were threatened by the Marathas. In early 1790, hoping to completely rid the Rajputana off Maratha interference, Rajput nobility allied with Mughal general Ismail Beg. The European armed and trained battalion of Benoît de Boigne defeated the Jaipur army at battle of Patan. Marathas managed to conquer Ajmer and Malwa from Rajputs. Marathas recovered over 105 pieces of artillery from the enemy, along with 21 elephants, 1300 camels and 300 horses.

Battle of Merta, 1790
The forces of Mahadji Shinde under de Boigne routed the Marwar army.

Capture of Ajmer, 1790
The forces of Mahadji Shinde captured Ajmer.

Capture of Shimoga

The Capture of Shimoga, a town and fortress held by forces of the Kingdom of Mysore, occurred on 3 January 1792 after a preliminary battle with the attacking forces of the British East India Company and the Marathas not far from the town on 29 December had scattered much of its defending army. The defenders surrendered after the fort's walls were breached. The battle was part of a campaign during the Third Anglo-Mysore War by Maratha leader Purseram Bhow to recover Maratha territories taken by Hyder Ali in an earlier conflict between Mysore and the Marathas. By the end of the siege Reza Sahib a leading Mysore commander was among the captured.

Battle of Kharda

The Battle of Kharda took place in February 1795 between the Nizam of Hyderabad, Asaf Jah II and Peshwa Madhavrao II, in which Nizam was badly defeated. Governor General John Shore followed the policy of non-intervention despite that Nizam was under his protection. So this led to the loss of trust with British and rout of the Hyderabad army.  This was the last battle fought together by all Maratha chieftains together.

Battle of Malpura

Combined force of Rathores and Kachhawaha Rajputs were defeated by the Maratha Force under Daulat Rao Scindia.

Second Anglo Maratha War (1803 - 1805)

Battle of Delhi, 1803

The Battle of Delhi took place on 11 September 1803 during the Second Anglo-Maratha War, between British troops under General Lake, and Marathas of Scindia's army under French General Louis Bourquin. The battle was fought at Patparganj, right across Yamuna River from Humayun's Tomb, also giving the battle its local name.

The Marathas occupied a strong position with the Jumna in their rear, and Lake, feigning a retreat, drew them from their lines, and then turning upon them drove them with the bayonet into the river, inflicting more losses upon them. The city of Delhi surrendered three days later. A monument was later erected at the site in Patparganj, marked out by a surrounding ditch, commemorating Cornet Sanguine and British soldiers who fell during the battle.

Battle of Bharatpur

Yashwantrao Holkar defeated the British army, led by Colonel Fawcett, at Kunch, in Bundelkhand. On 8 June 1804, the Governor General, in a letter to Lord Lake, wrote that the defeat caused a great insult to the British prestige in India. On 8 July 1804, Yashwantrao Holkar defeated the army of Colonel Manson and Leukan at Mukundare and Kota. Bapuji Scindia surrendered before Holkar. From June till September 1804, he defeated the British at different battles. On 8 October 1804, Holkar attacked Delhi to free Mughal Emperor Shah Alam II, who was imprisoned by the British. He attacked the army of Colonel Actorloni and Berne. The battle lasted for a week, but Yashwantrao Holkar could not succeed as Lord Lake came to help Colonel Actorloni.

On 16 November 1804, Yashwantrao Holkar reached Deeg by defeating the army of Major Frazer. After the death of Major Frazer, Manson took the charge of the British army. In Farrukhabad, Lord Lake was a mute spectator, watching Holkar proceeding towards Deeg; he didn't attack Holkar. Lord Lake attacked Deeg on 13 December 1804 (see- Battle of Bharatpur); the army of Holkar and Jat resisted successfully and reached the Bharatpur Durg. Lord Lake attacked Bharatpur on 3 January 1805, along with General Manson, Colonel Marey, Colonel Don, Colonel Berne, Major General Jones, General Smith, Colonel Jetland, Setan, and others. However, Holkar had to leave Bharatpur as the Jat King Ranjit Singh of Bharatpur defeated the British army on 17 April 1805.

Covering a large part of the subcontinent, the Maratha Empire kept the British forces at bay during the 18th century, until dissension between the Peshwas and their sardars (army commanders) saw a gradual downfall of the empire with the eventual defeat in the third Anglo-Maratha war the First Anglo-Maratha War ended in a stalemate with both sides signing the treaty of Salbai. This led to a period of relative peace between the two powers till the decisive second Anglo-Maratha war took place.

Third Anglo-Maratha War

The Third Anglo-Maratha War (1817–1818) was the final and decisive conflict between the British East India Company and the Maratha Empire in India. The war left the Company in control of most of India. It began with an invasion of Maratha territory by 110,400 British East India Company troops, the largest such British controlled force amassed in India. The troops were led by the Governor General Hastings and he was supported by a force under General Thomas Hislop. It resulted in the formal end of the Maratha empire and the firm establishment of the British East India Company in almost the entire Indian subcontinent. Then they defeated small states in north.

See also
Maratha Empire
List of Maratha dynasties and states
Shivaji
Sambhaji
Baji Rao I
Mahadaji Shinde
Rajaram I

References

38.^ a b c d Sarkar,Jadunath(1992).Shivaji and His Times. Orient Longman. ISBN 978-81-250-1347-1

Further reading
 "The Anglo-Maratha Campaigns and the Contest for India : The Struggle for Control of the South Asian Military Economy" by Randolf G. S. Cooper, Publisher: Cambridge University, 
Purandare, Babasaheb - Raja ShivChatrapati
Duff, Grant - History of Marhattas, London
Samant, S. D. - Vedh Mahamanavacha
Parulekar, Shyamrao - Yashogatha Vijaya durg, Vijay Durg (1982)
Kasar, D.B. - Rigveda to Raigarh making of Shivaji the great, Mumbai: Manudevi Prakashan (2005)
Apte, B.K. (editor) - Chhatrapati Shivaji: Coronation Tercentenary Commemoration Volume, Bombay: University of Bombay (1974–75)
Desai, Ranjeet - Shivaji the Great, Janata Raja (1968), Pune: Balwant Printers - English Translation of popular Marathi book.
Fanshawe, Herbert Charles. Delhi past and present p. 68
Marshman, John Clark. The History of India, from the earliest period to the close Lord Dalhousie's administration, Volume 2
Moor, Edward (1794). A narrative of the operations of captain Little's detachment, and of the Mahratta army (a detailed British account of the capture)
Mill, James. A history of British India, Volume 5
Duff, James Grant.  A history of the Mahrattas, Volume 2
http://www.historyfiles.co.uk/KingListsFarEast/IndiaMarathas.htm